Tortuosamine is an alkaloid found in Sceletium tortuosum.

References

Quinoline alkaloids
Secondary amines